Messiah Cathedral is an Indonesian megachurch of the predominantly Indonesian-Chinese Indonesian Reformed Evangelical Church ( (GRII)) in Kemayoran, Jakarta. It was opened on 20 September 2008 and inaugurated next day as a dedication to Lord Jesus Christ by Stephen Tong the leader of the GRII church.

Despite the name, this church building is not a true cathedral in the sense of "the seat of a bishop" (it does not house a cathedra, i.e. bishop's throne), since the GRII church is of presbyterian polity. The church/cathedral is part of the larger Reformed Millennium Center Indonesia (RMCI) building complex and is "the head - front building". The other parts of this, "the body - middle building", are International Reformed Evangelical Seminary, the concert hall Aula Simfonia Jakarta, the International Reformed Evangelical Seminary (IRES) as many as its facilities (the library "Augustine", the "Martin Luther" Chapel, dormitory, mense, guest room, etc.), the rest "the tail - end building" are the art exhibition Sofilia Fine Arts Center, and Calvin Christian School.

The church has a capacity of about 8,000, as noted in various newspapers. Whereas it is a sum of many separated halls and chamber, i.e., 4,416 seats in Messiah Hall as main Hall, 1,753 seats in John Calvin Hall, 450 seats in Hosanna Hall, 300 seats in Agape Chamber.

National Gospel Convention (KIN) 2013 and 2014 have conducted in this place each year.

See also
List of church buildings in Indonesia

References

External links
 

Cathedrals in Indonesia
Chinese Indonesian culture
Churches in Jakarta
Protestant church buildings in Asia
Christian organizations established in 2008